Rayen "Red Bean" Simson (born May 22, 1972) is a Surinamese-Dutch former super middleweight Muay Thai kickboxer. He won 7 world titles in 3 different organizations and was ranked number 2 at the Lumpinee Stadium  - a notoriously difficult achievement for a farang fighter.  He has also won a European title, 2 Dutch titles and has won tournaments in Shoot Boxing and K-1 MAX.  During his career he has amassed over 100 wins and he holds notable victories over fighters such as Ramon Dekkers, Ashwin Balrak and Faldir Chahbari.  He had his last fight in 2010.

Biography and Career
Rayen Simson entered his first major tournament in 1995 where he competed in the inaugural Shoot Boxing World Tournament 1995 in Osaka, Japan, along with eight other fighters from across the world.  The young Simson was unable to make much of an impact at the event, losing in the quarter final stage after a tough five round battle with Thai Bovi Chorwaikan.  He returned to Europe where he won the W.P.K.L. European title and went on an impressive winning streak, culminating in a victory over the legendary Ramon Dekkers in a memorable match in Roosendaal in 1997. Simson recovered from two knockdowns (one the famous double knockdown) to defeat Dekkers by technical knockout at the end of the second round.

His confidence high Simon headed back to Japan to participate in the Shoot Boxing World Tournament 1997, which he had qualified for by beating the ’95 finalist Roni Lewis the previous year. Simson defeated ’95 champion Hiromu Yoshitaka in the semi finals before defeating Mohamed Ouali in the final by unanimous decision to claim his first major title.  Over the next few years he would win a number of fights before defeating Najim Ettouhlali in 1997 for the W.P.K.L European title and Hassan Ettaki in 1998 for the W.P.K.L. World title.  In 1999 Simson faced multiple Muay Thai world champion and living legend Ivan Hippolyte in the first of their two fights, inflicting a rare defeat on Hippolyte after five gruelling rounds.  The two fighters would meet again the next year in a rematch in what would be Hippolyte's last ever match.  This time Simson was unable to defeat Hippolyte, being knocked down in the third before withdrawing from the fight in the fourth due to a leg injury.

Simson would go back to winning ways at the start of the millennium, between 2000 and 2002 he won the Dutch national Muay Thai title, the I.K.B.O World title and the 72.6 kg version of his W.P.K.L World title against Ashwin Balrak. Towards the end of 2002 he faced Joerie Mes in Haarlem, Netherlands. Simson lost by technical knockout after being outworked by the relentless Mes over four rounds. This match would spark the beginning of a fierce rivalry between the two men – they would fight two more times, with Mes being something of a nemesis to Simson, winning all three times. In 2003 he would win the World Kickboxing Network (W.K.N.) World title in his native Suriname before making his K-1 debut at the K-1 Holland Grand Prix 2003, losing by decision to Perry Ubeda. He would meet Ubeda several years later in 2005 in a losing bid for the World Full Contact Association (W.F.C.A.) 72.5 kg title.

In 2006 Simson would return to K-1 at the K-1 MAX Netherlands 2006 eight man tournament where the prize for winning was a reserve fight at the forthcoming K-1 MAX World Final. Simson booked his flight to Tokyo by defeating Faldir Chahbari in the final by extra round decision.  He faced Artur Kyshenko at the K-1 World MAX 2006 Final but lost by third round majority decision, although the result would not mean overmuch as no injuries occurred during the final.  At the end of the year and after a nine-year absence, Simson was invited back to the S-Cup to take part in another reserve fight at the Shoot Boxing World Tournament 2006. The ’97 S-Cup winner won his bout against Koichi Kikuchi but would not have the chance to proceed as there were no injuries. This event would be his last major international tournament.

Between 2006 and 2009 Simson would enter several small tournaments in Europe, winning the TaoThai "Cosa Nostra" Kombat League in Italy. By this point, despite the odd victory, age was taking its toll and his career was winding to a close. In 2009 he faced Eugene Ekkelboom in Montego Bay, Jamaica for Eugune’s W.M.C. Super Middleweight World title in what would be Simson's last title fight. Simson lost the bout by technical knockout, suffering an arm injury at the start of the fourth. In 2010 he had his final match at It's Showtime 2010 Amsterdam against Şahin Yakut, who was a replacement for his initial opponent Khalid Bourdif, who Simson had handpicked for his retirement match. Simson was unable to finish his career with a win, battling valiantly but ultimately losing by unanimous decision.

Titles
2007 Kombat League Champion
2006 K-1 MAX Netherlands 2006 The Road to Tokyo Champion
2005 Rings Fight Gala Muaythai tournament champion -72.5 kg
2003 W.K.N. World Champion -76.2 kg
2002 W.P.K.L. World Champion -76.2 kg
2001 I.K.B.O. World Champion
2000 M.T.B.N. Dutch Champion
1998 W.P.K.L. World Champion -72 kg
1997 W.P.K.L. European Champion -72 kg
1997 Shoot Boxing World Tournament 1997 Champion
1995 W.P.K.L. European Champion
Ranked Number 2 at Lumpinee Stadium

Kickboxing record

|-
|-  bgcolor="#FFBBBB"
| 2010-05-29 || Loss ||align=left| Şahin Yakut || It's Showtime 2010 Amsterdam || Amsterdam, Netherlands || Decision (5-0) || 3 || 3:00
|-
|-  bgcolor="#FFBBBB"
| 2009-06-26 || Loss ||align=left| Eugene Ekkelboom || Champions of Champions 2 || Montego Bay, Jamaica || TKO (Arm Injury) || 4 || 0:14
|-
! style=background:white colspan=9 |
|-
|-  bgcolor="#CCFFCC"
| 2008-11-30 || Win ||align=left| Lamsongkram Chuwattana || Slamm 5 "Nederland vs Thailand" || Almere, Netherlands || TKO (Doctor Stoppage) || 2 || 
|-
|-  bgcolor="#FFBBBB"
| 2007-08-31 || Loss ||align=left| José Reis || Steko's Fight Night 25, Semi Finals || Karlsruhe, Germany || Decision || 3 || 3:00
|-
|-  bgcolor="#FFBBBB"
| 2008-03-15 || Loss ||align=left| Dmitry Shakuta || It's Showtime 75MAX Trophy 2008, Quarter Finals || 's-Hertogenbosch, Netherlands || Decision || 3 || 3:00
|-
|-  bgcolor="#CCFFCC"
| 2007-04-27 || Win ||align=left| Eddy Saban || TaoThai "Cosa Nostra" Kombat League, Final || Taormina, Italy || TKO (Referee Stoppage, Knee) || 1 ||
|-
! style=background:white colspan=9 |
|-
|-  bgcolor="#CCFFCC"
| 2007-04-27 || Win ||align=left| Matteo Sciacca || TaoThai "Cosa Nostra" Kombat League, Semi Finals || Taormina, Italy || TKO (Referee Stoppage, Knee) || 2 ||
|-
|-  bgcolor="#CCFFCC"
| 2007-03-24 || Win ||align=left| Mesut Acikyol || It's Showtime Trophy 2007 || Lommel, Belgium || Decision || 3 || 3:00
|-
! style=background:white colspan=9 |
|-
|-  bgcolor="#FFBBBB"
| 2007-03-10 || Loss ||align=left| Roberto Cocco || Steko's Fight Night 23, Final || Munich, Germany || Decision (Unanimous) || 3 || 3:00
|-
! style=background:white colspan=9 |
|-
|-  bgcolor="#CCFFCC"
| 2007-03-10 || Win||align=left| István Tóth || Steko's Fight Night 23, Semi Finals || Munich, Germany || || ||
|-
|-  bgcolor="#CCFFCC"
| 2007-04-27 || Win ||align=left| Samir Dourid || Night of Pride || Paramaribo, Suriname || KO || 3 ||
|-
! style=background:white colspan=9 |
|-
|-  bgcolor="#FFBBBB"
| 2006-12-09 || Loss ||align=left| Faldir Chahbari || || Roosendaal, Netherlands || TKO (Corner Stoppage) || 3 ||
|-
|-  bgcolor="#CCFFCC"
| 2006-11-03 || Win ||align=left| Koichi Kikuchi || S-Cup 2006, Reserve Fight || Tokyo, Japan || Decision (Majority) || 3 || 3:00
|-
|-  bgcolor="#FFBBBB"
| 2006-06-30 || Loss ||align=left| Artur Kyshenko || K-1 World MAX 2006 Final, Reserve Fight || Yokohama, Japan || Decision (Majority) || 3 || 3:00
|-
|-  bgcolor="#CCFFCC"
| 2006-03-26 || Win ||align=left| Faldir Chahbari || K-1 MAX Netherlands 2006, Final || Utrecht, Netherlands || Ext.R Decision || 4 || 3:00
|-
! style=background:white colspan=9 |
|-
|-  bgcolor="#CCFFCC"
| 2006-03-26 || Win ||align=left| Ray Staring || K-1 MAX Netherlands 2006, Semi Finals || Utrecht, Netherlands || Decision || 3 || 3:00
|-
|-  bgcolor="#CCFFCC"
| 2006-03-26 || Win ||align=left| Junior Gonsalves || K-1 MAX Netherlands 2006, Quarter Finals || Utrecht, Netherlands || Decision || 3 || 3:00
|-
|-  bgcolor="#CCFFCC"
| 2005-12-11 || Win ||align=left| Imro Main || Rings Fight Gala, Final || Utrecht, Netherlands || Decision || 3 || 3:00 
|-
! style=background:white colspan=9 |
|-
|-  bgcolor="#CCFFCC"
| 2005-12-11 || Win ||align=left| Junior Gonsalves || Rings Fight Gala, Semi Final || Utrecht, Netherlands || Decision || 3 || 3:00 
|-
|-  bgcolor="#FFBBBB"
| 2005-11-13 || Loss ||align=left| Perry Ubeda || Time for Action || Nijmegen, Netherlands || Decision || 12 || 2:00
|-
! style=background:white colspan=9 |
|-
|-  bgcolor="#c5d2ea"
| 2005-10-29 || Draw ||align=left| Toshio Matsumoto || No Kick, No Life || Tokyo, Japan || Decision Draw || 5 || 3:00 
|-
|-  bgcolor="#FFBBBB"
| 2005-10-02 || Loss ||align=left| Emil Zoraj || It's Showtime 75 MAX Trophy Tilburg Pool B Semi Finals || Tilburg, Netherlands || Decision (Unanimous) || 3 || 3:00
|-
|-  bgcolor="#FFBBBB"
| 2005-06-12 || Loss ||align=left| Joerie Mes || It's Showtime 2005 Amsterdam || Amsterdam, Netherlands || Decision (Unanimous) || 5 || 3:00
|-
|-  bgcolor="#CCFFCC"
| 2005-04-03 || Win ||align=left| Amir Zeyada || Rings Muay Thai Gala || Netherlands || TKO (Corner stoppage/towel) || 5 ||
|-  bgcolor="#CCFFCC"
| 2005-02-19 || Win ||align=left| Takaaki Nakamura || Rising Sun - Muay Thai Gala || Beilen, Netherlands || Disqualification || 4 ||
|-
|-  bgcolor="#CCFFCC"
| 2004-11-14 || Win ||align=left| Pajonsuk || Muay Thai/Mixed Fight Gala, Sporthal Stedenwijk || Almere, Netherlands || Decision || 5 || 3:00
|-
|-  bgcolor="#CCFFCC"
| 2004-05-20 || Win ||align=left| Leonard Sitpholek || It's Showtime 2004 Amsterdam || Amsterdam, Netherlands || Decision || 5 || 3:00 
|-  bgcolor="#FFBBBB"
| 2003-11-30 || Loss ||align=left| Vincent Vielvoye || Killer Dome IV @ Bijlmer Sportcentrum || Amsterdam, Netherlands || Decision (Unanimous) || 5 || 3:00
|-  bgcolor="#CCFFCC"
| 2003-11-19 || Win ||align=left| Denis Sharoykin || Battle of Zaandam || Zaandam, Netherlands || Decision || 5 || 3:00
|-  bgcolor="#CCFFCC"
| 2003-06-08 || Win ||align=left| Najim Ettouhlali || It's Showtime 2003 Amsterdam || Amsterdam, Netherlands || Decision || 5 || 3:00 
|-
|-  bgcolor="#FFBBBB"
| 2003-04-06 || Loss ||align=left| Perry Ubeda || K-1 Holland Grand Prix 2003 || Zoetermeer, Netherlands || Decision (Unanimous) || 3 || 3:00
|-
|-  bgcolor="#FFBBBB"
| 2003-03-16 || Loss ||align=left| Joerie Mes || Victory or Hell || Amsterdam, Netherlands || Decision (Unanimous) || 5 || 3:00
|-
|-  bgcolor="#CCFFCC"
| 2003 || Win ||align=left| Laurent Periquet || || Paramaribo, Suriname || Decision || 5 || 3:00
|-
! style=background:white colspan=9 |
|-
|-  bgcolor="#c5d2ea"
| 2002-11-29 || NC ||align=left| Ashwin Balrak || W.P.K.L. Muay Thai Champions League VIII || Rotterdam, Netherlands || No Contest (Shoulder Injury) || 1 || 
|-
! style=background:white colspan=9 |
|-
|-  bgcolor="#FFBBBB"
| 2002-09-29 || Loss ||align=left| Joerie Mes || It's Showtime – As Usual / Battle Time || Haarlem, Netherlands || TKO (Corner Stoppage) || 4 ||
|-
|-  bgcolor="#CCFFCC"
| 2002-03-18 || Win ||align=left| Ashwin Balrak || 2Hot2Handle "Simply the Best" 4 || Rotterdam, Netherlands || Decision (Unanimous) || 5 || 3:00
|-
! style=background:white colspan=9 |
|-
|-  bgcolor="#CCFFCC"
| 2001-05-06 || Win ||align=left| Riad Rekhis || Victory or Hell || Amsterdam, Netherlands || Decision || 5 || 3:00
|-
|-  bgcolor="#CCFFCC"
| 2001-03-18 || Win ||align=left| Sergei Karpin || 2H2H - Simply The Best || Amsterdam, Netherlands || Decision || 5 || 3:00
|-
|-  bgcolor="#FFBBBB"
| 2000-10-22 || Loss ||align=left| Ivan Hippolyte || It's Showtime - Exclusive || Netherlands || TKO (Leg Injury) || 4 || 1:00
|-
|-  bgcolor="#CCFFCC"
| 2000-09-03 || Win ||align=left| Kamal El Amrani || Battle of Arnhem II || Arnhem, Netherlands || Decision || 5 || 3:00
|-
! style=background:white colspan=9 |
|-
|-  bgcolor="#CCFFCC"
| 2000-05-20 || Win ||align=left| Peter Kley || Thaiboxing - Thrill of the Year || Amsterdam, Netherlands || Decision (Unanimous) || 5 || 3:00
|-
! style=background:white colspan=9 |
|-
|-  bgcolor="#CCFFCC"
| 1999-10-24 || Win ||align=left| Ivan Hippolyte || It's Showtime - It's Showtime || Haarlem, Netherlands || Decision || 5 || 3:00
|-
|- style="background:#cfc;"
| ? || Win||align=left| Orono Por Muang Ubon ||  ||  Thailand  || Decision || 5 || 3:00
|-  bgcolor="#FFBBBB"
| 1999 || Loss ||align=left| Yoddecha Sityodthong || || Bangkok, Thailand || Decision || 5 || 3:00
|-
|-  bgcolor="#CCFFCC"
| 1998-12-03 || Win ||align=left| Hassan Ettaki || Night of the Superstars || Amsterdam, Netherlands || Decision || 5 || 3:00
|-
! style=background:white colspan=9 |
|-
|-  bgcolor="#FFBBBB"
| 1998-11-14 || Loss ||align=left| Jomhod Kiatadisak || W.P.K.L. Muay Thai Champions League III, Semi Finals || Amsterdam, the Netherlands || Decision || 3 || 3:00
|-
|-  bgcolor="#CCFFCC"
| 1998-05-23 || Win ||align=left| Stjepan Veselic || W.P.K.L. Muay Thai Champions League II, Quarter Finals || Roosendaal, the Netherlands || KO || 1 || 
|-
! style=background:white colspan=9 |
|-
|-  bgcolor="#CCFFCC"
| 1998-05-23 || Win ||align=left| Kamal El Amrani || W.P.K.L. Muay Thai Champions League II, 1st Round || Roosendaal, the Netherlands || Decision || 3 || 3:00
|-
|-  bgcolor="#CCFFCC"
| 1998 || Win ||align=left| Pajak Lek || || Milan, Italy || Decision || 5 || 3:00 
|-
|-  bgcolor="#CCFFCC"
| 1997-12-13 || Win ||align=left| Najim Ettouhlali || Thaiboxing Den Bosch || Den Bosch, Netherlands || Decision || 5 || 3:00  
|-
! style=background:white colspan=9 |
|-
|-  bgcolor="#CCFFCC"
| 1997-11-10 || Win ||align=left| Nong Moon || The Night of the New Generation || Amsterdam, Netherlands || Decision || 5 || 3:00
|-
|-  bgcolor="#FFBBBB"
| 1997-06-01 || Loss ||align=left| Hassan Ettaki || Thaiboxing: Battle of Amsterdam || Amsterdam, Netherlands || TKO || ||
|-
|-  bgcolor="#CCFFCC"
| 1997-05-09 || Win ||align=left| Mohamed Ouali || S-Cup 1997, Final || Tokyo, Japan || Decision (Unanimous) || 3 || 3:00
|-
! style=background:white colspan=9 |
|-
|-  bgcolor="#CCFFCC"
| 1997-05-09 || Win ||align=left| Hiromu Yoshitaka || S-Cup 1997, Semi Finals || Tokyo, Japan || || || 
|-
|-  bgcolor="#CCFFCC"
| 1997-04-20 || Win ||align=left| Dejpitak Sityodtong || The Night of No Mercy || Amsterdam, Netherlands || Decision || 5 || 3:00 
|-
|-  bgcolor="#CCFFCC"
| 1997-03-23 || Win ||align=left| Ramon Dekkers || Muay Thai Gala: The Night of War || Roosendaal, Netherlands || TKO (Corner Stoppage) || 2 || 3:00 
|-
|-  bgcolor="#CCFFCC"
| 1996-10-07 || Win ||align=left| Jon Vargas || Thaiboxing Imperium II || Rotterdam, Netherlands || KO || 1 ||  
|-
|-  bgcolor="#CCFFCC"
| 1996-07-14 || Win ||align=left| Roni Lewis || S-Cup 1996 || Tokyo, Japan || Decision (Unanimous) || 3 || 3:00
|-
! style=background:white colspan=9 |
|-
|-  bgcolor="#CCFFCC"
| 1995 || Win ||align=left| Chris Allen || || Netherlands || || ||
|-
! style=background:white colspan=9 |
|-
|-  bgcolor="#FFBBBB"
| 1995-01-31 || Loss ||align=left| Bovi Chorwaikan || S-Cup 1995, Quarter Finals || Osaka, Japan || 2nd Ext.R Decision (Unanimous) || 5 || 3:00
|-
|-  bgcolor="#CCFFCC"
| 1993-11-26 || Win ||align=left| Alwen Lobles || Thaiboxing gala, Houtrusthallen || The Hague, Netherlands || Decision || 5 || 3:00 
|-
|-  bgcolor="#CCFFCC"
| 1993-07-08 || Win ||align=left| Kiyotaka Kato || THE WARS’93 || Tokyo, Japan || Decision (Split) || 5 || 3:00
|-  bgcolor="#CCFFCC"
| 1993-01-29 || Win ||align=left| Lodewijk Vercounteren || The Best of Best || Best, Netherlands || KO || 2 || 
|-
|-
| colspan=9 | Legend:

See also
List of male kickboxers
List of K-1 events
Muay thai

References

1972 births
Living people
Dutch male kickboxers
Surinamese male kickboxers
Middleweight kickboxers
Dutch Muay Thai practitioners
Surinamese Muay Thai practitioners
Surinamese emigrants to the Netherlands
Sportspeople from Paramaribo